Mount Pikui  at , is the highest mountain in Lviv Oblast, Ukraine and part of the Carpathian Mountains, Stryi-San Highland spine.

Located on the border of Lviv and Transcarpathian regions. It is in the Watershed of Beskydy. Is part of the landscape reserve of national importance "Pikui".
The name of the mountains probably comes from a Thracian or Illyrian origin.

References

External links 
 Highest peaks of Carpathians
 Рельєф Львівської області. Гори. Гора Пікуй - найвища точка Львівщини

Mountains of Ukraine
Mountains of the Eastern Carpathians
One-thousanders of Ukraine